Bindki Road railway station (station code BKO) is a small railway station located in SH 46, Pahur Town, Bindki, Fatehpur district in the Indian state of Uttar Pradesh.

Trains 
 Chauri-Chaura Express
 Kanpur Central - Chitrakoot Dham Intercity
 Prayagraj - Kanpur Central Passenger
 Fatehpur - Kanpur Central MEMU
 Udyan Abha Toofan Express

References

Railway stations in Uttar Pradesh
Railway stations in Fatehpur district
North Central Railway zone